The Barghest O' Whitby is an EP by the doom metal band My Dying Bride, released on 7 November 2011. It consists of a single, 27-minute track.

Background
Speaking to Lords of Metal, Aaron Stainthorpe said of the piece:  
According to Stainthorpe, the artwork pictures the band's guitarist's Hamish Glencross' dog which he "embellished... a little bit in Photoshop. It is all my kind of artwork, pushed together to give a visual interpretation of what you might see in the lyrics. It is quite nice, no high art, but it is just an interpretation of what you are going to get inside the music".

Track listing

Credits
 Aaron Stainthorpe — vocals
 Andrew Craighan — guitar
 Hamish Glencross — guitar
 Lena Abé — bass
 Shaun "Winter" Taylor-Steels — drums
 Shaun Macgowan — violin and keyboards

References

My Dying Bride EPs
2011 EPs